Paveley is a surname. Notable people with the surname include:

John Paveley (died 1371), Grand Prior of the Order of Knights of the Hospital of Saint John of Jerusalem
Walter Paveley (1319–1375), English knight, founder of the Order of the Garter